Free Willy: Escape from Pirate's Cove is a 2010 American family film written and directed by Will Geiger with the story by Cindy McCreery. It is a reboot as well as the fourth and final installment in the Free Willy film series. It stars Bindi Irwin, in her film debut, and Beau Bridges. The film was released on DVD and Blu-ray on 23 March 2010 in the United States, and on 2 August in the United Kingdom and Ireland.

It is the only film in the series not to feature any cast members from the first three installments, and the only film to be released direct-to-video. Like the two previous films Willy the killer whale is not portrayed by a real killer whale, instead a combination of an electric robotic creature and CGI are used.

Plot 
Australian child Kirra is sent to stay with her grandfather, Gus, in his run-down amusement park in Cape Town, South Africa, when her father is hospitalized for six weeks. Upon arrival, Kirra is met at the airport by Mansa, one of Gus's employees. Kirra is initially unhappy about leaving her father, but she eventually makes friends with a boy named Sifiso.

After a fierce storm, a baby male orca is separated from his pod, and becomes stranded in a lagoon on Gus's property. The next morning, Kirra discovers the animal and names him Willy. Willy proves to be a big hit amongst the park visitors, but the stress keeps him from eating. Kirra, concerned, persuades him to eat.

Gus's competitor Rolf Woods learns about the new attraction at Gus's park, and offers to buy Willy for $500,000, but no deal is made. After much perseverance, Kirra persuades Gus to call the marine rescue center for help in rehabilitating Willy back into the sea. However, Willy has under-developed echolocation skills and is unable to survive without his pod, thus making him unsuitable for rehabilitation. Not one to give up, Kirra does much research on how to train Willy to use his echolocation skill, despite being told that there is no known method to do so. She then tries and fails to feed Willy while he is blindfolded.

Rolf, desperate for Willy, hires two men and hatches a plot to poison Willy to induce Gus to sell the orca at a cheaper price, but Kirra spots the two at work and foils the plot. The henchmen flee, but Rolf denies all knowledge of the matter, though he offers to buy Willy again.

Kirra then camps out by the lagoon to calm Willy. Suddenly he wakes her up, pulls her into the water, and lets her ride him. In this way, Kirra and Willy become a double-act at the park, attracting many reporters and cameramen. The money the act earns then funds the fish needed for Willy's echolocation training. After many tries, Willy learns to use his echolocation, and manages to catch live fish swimming in the lagoon. In the meantime, Rolf returns to tempt Gus with a lower offer for Willy. Faced with a mounting food bill, Gus agrees to sell Willy to Rolf for $500,000, and insists the exchange take place after Kirra's departure.

Mansa makes an underwater recording device to record Willy's sounds, hoping to use them to locate Willy's pod, but several days' attempts prove fruitless. One day, Sifiso invites Kirra to go to his Uncle Rudy's safari park to take her mind off Willy. On their way back, they see a billboard advertising Willy as a new attraction to Rolf's theme park. The pair hurry back, but find that Gus has already signed the agreement to sell Willy. Kirra is heartbroken, and makes Gus promise to make sure that Rolf takes good care of Willy. Later, when Kirra goes down to the lagoon, she sees Willy's pod. However, Gus does not believe her.

Kirra and Sifiso go to seek Uncle Rudy's help with their plan to put Willy back into the ocean. Unable to find him, the two steal a crane truck and drive it back to Pirate's Cove. Later, Gus agrees to help them return Willy to the ocean if his pod can be found. Kirra and Sifiso then head for the harbour with Willy, while Gus and Mansa stay to distract Rolf, who is already on his way. Eventually they find Willy's family, and Willy is reunited with them. Kirra jumps into the water to bid Willy farewell.

Kirra is next seen saying goodbye to Mansa and Sifiso before she leaves for the airport, promising to come back the next summer. As she gets on the plane, Gus wipes away a tear. Kirra smiles as she takes a final look on Cape Town. Meanwhile, Willy and his pod swim off into the ocean depths.

Cast 
 Bindi Irwin as Kirra
 Beau Bridges as Gus Grisby
 Bongolethu Mbutuma as Mansa
 Siyabulela Ramba as Sifiso
 Stephen Jennings as Rolf V.D. Woods
 Matthew Roberts as Blikkie
 Heima Jaffa as Jayce
 Kevin Otto as Dr. Sam Cooper
 Louw Venter as Diff
 Darron Meyer as Doctor
 Getmore Sithole as Uncle Rudy
 Robert Irwin as Pirate Boy (uncredited)

References

External links 
 
 

2010 direct-to-video films
2010 films
2010s children's films
2010s English-language films
Films about dolphins
Films about whales
Films about animals
Films about children
Fictional orcas
Films about animal rights
Films about families
Films about friendship
Films shot in Australia
Films set in Australia
Films shot in South Australia
Films set in South Australia
Films shot in South Africa
Films set in South Africa
Films set in Cape Town
Films set in amusement parks
Films with underwater settings
Puppet films
Reboot films
Warner Bros. direct-to-video films
Free Willy (franchise)
2010s American films